Robert La Touche (October 1773 – 19 May 1844) was an Irish Whig politician.

La Touche was the Member of Parliament for Harristown in the Irish House of Commons between 1794 and the disenfranchisement of the constituency under the Acts of Union 1800. He subsequently represented Kildare in the House of Commons of the United Kingdom from 1802 to 1830 as a Whig.

He was the son of the politician John La Touche.

References

1773 births
1844 deaths
18th-century Anglo-Irish people
19th-century Anglo-Irish people
Irish MPs 1790–1797
Irish MPs 1798–1800
Members of the Parliament of Ireland (pre-1801) for County Kildare constituencies
Members of the Parliament of the United Kingdom for County Kildare constituencies (1801–1922)
UK MPs 1802–1806
UK MPs 1806–1807
UK MPs 1807–1812
UK MPs 1812–1818
UK MPs 1818–1820
UK MPs 1820–1826
UK MPs 1826–1830
Whig (British political party) MPs for Irish constituencies